The Drayton Court is a boutique hotel and one of the oldest pubs in Ealing, west London. The former Vietnamese revolutionary and statesman, Hồ Chí Minh, worked in the kitchens in 1914.

History
The pub was conceived as a family and residential hotel, and the plans were drawn in 1893 by the Stephens Brothers. The pub opened in 1894, making it one of the oldest pubs in Ealing. It contained four floors and sixty rooms; behind the hotel were ornamental gardens, tennis courts, a bowling green and skittle courts. It initially charged 25 shillings per week for residents.

Hồ Chí Minh, the former Vietnamese revolutionary and statesman, worked in the kitchens of the Drayton Court Hotel in 1914.

The building remained a hotel until the 1940s, when it became one of the area's largest pubs, an off Licence was granted for the sale of beers and spirits to be consumed off the premises. Delivery to local customers was by bike with a large wicker basket over a small front wheel. It is in possession of a fringe theatre.

At this time the pub had the largest beer garden in London (and indeed, the largest of any city in the UK).

In Spring 2011, the pub was refurbished and renovated into being a fully equipped 4 star hotel. The Drayton Court Hotel is now a popular place for tourists and business trips alike as well as often hosting wedding parties in its boutique rooms and suites.

It is owned by Fullers Brewery.

Media
The pub has been seen on screen on several occasions, including in the film Carry On Constable and, along with the vintage shop-fronts immediately adjacent, in the final "classic era" Doctor Who serial, 1989's Survival.

References

External links
 Drayton Court official site
 The Doctor Who Locations Guide - The Avenue, West Ealing

1894 establishments in England
Hotels in London
Ho Chi Minh
Pubs in the London Borough of Ealing